— informally, ; often called STEP Eiken or the STEP Test — is an English language test conducted by a Japanese public-interest incorporated foundation, the Eiken Foundation of Japan (formerly the Society for Testing English Proficiency, Inc. [STEP]), and backed by the Japanese Ministry of Education, Culture, Sports, Science and Technology (MEXT).

Format and contents
Eiken is a criterion-referenced test. There are seven levels that examinees either pass or fail. The levels (級 kyū) are called grades:

Eiken is a four-skills test, assessing a combination of receptive and productive skills. In addition to reading, listening and speaking tests, Grades 1, Pre-1 and 2 include a handwritten composition task.

Eiken in Japan
In Japan, Eiken is conducted three times a year: January/February, June/July, and October/November. There are two stages in the test, the first stage (vocabulary, reading, listening, and writing) and the second stage (speaking, applicants for Grade 4 or 5 are exempted). Only those who pass the first stage can progress to the second stage. The second stage is conducted about one month after the first stage. Applicants who pass both stages receive certification.

English teachers in junior high schools and high schools in Japan often encourage their students to take the Eiken. Approximately 18,000 schools serve as test sites. Japanese high schools and universities often grant preferential status to student applicants who have passed a specified Eiken grade, such as waiving the English portion of the school's entrance examination.

In its 2003 strategic initiative "Japanese with English Abilities" and 2011 follow-up , MEXT designated Eiken Grade 3 as a benchmark proficiency level for junior high school graduates, Grades 2 and Pre-2 for high school graduates, and Grade Pre-1 for English teachers.

In fiscal 2010, examinees for all Eiken grades totaled approximately 2.3 million. According to the Eiken website, the test has been taken by over 100 million applicants since its inception in 1963.

Eiken outside Japan
A number of schools outside Japan use Eiken as an admission qualification for international students. In Canada and the United States, approximately 400 colleges and universities recognize Eiken Grade 2, Grade 2A, Grade Pre-1, and/or Grade 1 for incoming students, as of 2021. In Australia, the state of New South Wales recognizes Eiken at all Technical and Further Education (TAFE) institutes and all state high schools. The test is also used at institutions in Queensland, Tasmania, Victoria, and Western Australia.

The success of the Eiken model has attracted attention from other Asian countries. The Korea Times in 2009 quoted Ahn Byong-man, Minister of Education, Science and Technology, that a new national English test being developed by the Korean Education Ministry is based on the Eiken.

Research on the Eiken tests
In recent years, a number of large-scale research projects have been undertaken by the Eiken Foundation, either as in-house projects or through research grants to international testing specialists. An outline of recent projects is given on the Eiken website under the heading Demonstrating validity, a list of recent projects, and includes a list of references for where results have been reported, including in edited books and peer-reviewed professional journals and presentations at research conferences. A list of research projects commissioned by Eiken in Japan is published on the website of the Eiken English Education Research Center.

In 2003, work was begun on the Eiken Can-do List. The finished list, published in 2006, is based on a survey of 20,000 Eiken certificate holders and is designed to investigate what “test takers believe they can accomplish in English in real-life language use situations.” The list is also available in Japanese. More recent projects include an evaluation of the Eiken testing program carried out by international testing specialist Professor James D. Brown and a number of criterion-referenced validity studies investigating the relationship between the Eiken grades and other criterion measures of English ability.

The Eiken Foundation has also conducted research into the Common European Framework of Reference (CEFR). A comparison of Eiken Grades with the levels of the CEFR is provided on the Eiken website along with a description of the research supporting the claim of relevance between the various Eiken grades and the CEFR. A report on the same project is also available in Japanese.

The Eiken Foundation administers a system of grants for independent research projects carried out by educators. Grants are not restricted to research on the Eiken tests, or testing in general, and are available for various projects investigating aspects of language education and suggestions for improving teaching and testing in Japan. Information on how to apply is available on the Eiken Japanese website. Reports on these projects are published online in the journal EIKEN BULLETIN.

Other English proficiency tests
 IELTS, International English Language Testing System
 GTEC, Global Test of English Communication
 TOEIC, Test of English for International Communication
 TOEFL, Test of English as a Foreign Language
WIDA MODEL, (Measure of Developing English Language) Kindergarten - Grade 12
 TrackTest, English Proficiency Test Online 
 TSE, Test of Spoken English
 UBELT University of Bath English Language Test.
 University of Cambridge ESOL Examinations
 Trinity College London ESOL
 United Nations Associations Test of English

References

1963 establishments in Japan
Testing and exams in Japan
English language tests